Vando Jorge Lopes Da Costa Neto (born 24 July 1992), simply known as Vando, is a São Toméan footballer who plays as a midfielder for UD Rei Amador and the São Tomé and Príncipe national team.

International career
Vando made his international debut for São Tomé and Príncipe in 2015.

References

1992 births
Living people
Association football midfielders
São Tomé and Príncipe footballers
São Tomé and Príncipe international footballers
Sporting Praia Cruz players
UDRA players